Edward Rath may refer to:
 Edward Rath III, member of the New York State Senate
 Edward A. Rath, American politician, county executive of Erie County, New York